The 1928 PGA Championship was the 11th PGA Championship, held October 1–6 at the Five Farms Course of the Baltimore Country Club in Lutherville, Maryland, north of Baltimore. Then a match play championship, Leo Diegel defeated Al Espinosa 6 & 5 in the finals to win the first of his two consecutive titles.

Prior to the finals, Diegel defeated both Walter Hagen and Gene Sarazen, the winners of the previous seven PGA Championships, in the two preceding matches. He prevailed 2 & 1 over nemesis Hagen in the quarterfinals and 9 & 8 over Sarazen in the semifinals. Diegel had lost to Hagen in the 1925 quarterfinals (40 holes) and the 1926 finals.

Five-time champion Hagen had won 22 consecutive matches and four straight titles at the PGA Championship. Prior to his loss to Diegel in the quarterfinals, his match record in the 1920s was 32–1, falling only to Sarazen in 38 holes in the 1923 finals.

The Five Farms Course, now the East Course, was designed by A. W. Tillinghast and opened two years earlier in September 1926.

Diegel continued the tradition of repeat champions and successfully defended his title in 1929.

Format
The match play format at the PGA Championship in 1928 called for 12 rounds (216 holes) in six days:
 Monday – 36-hole stroke play qualifier
top 32 professionals advanced to match play
 Tuesday – first round – 36 holes 
 Wednesday – second round – 36 holes 
 Thursday – quarterfinals – 36 holes 
 Friday – semifinals – 36 holes 
 Saturday – final – 36 holes

Past champions in the field

Final results
Saturday, October 6, 1928

Final eight bracket

References

External links
PGA Media Guide 2012
PGA.com – 1928 PGA Championship 
Baltimore Country Club: East Course

PGA Championship
Golf in Maryland
Sports competitions in Baltimore
PGA Championship
PGA Championship
PGA Championship
PGA Championship